Frane Lojić (born 8 October 1985 in Split, Croatia) is a Croatian retired football player, who last played for NK Konavljanin in the Treća HNL.

Managerial career
He left his position as GOŠK Dubrovnik manager in summer 2022. He had joined them after three seasons at Croatia Gabrile.

References

External links
 

1985 births
Living people
Footballers from Split, Croatia
Association football midfielders
Croatian footballers
Croatia youth international footballers
Croatia under-21 international footballers
HNK Hajduk Split players
NK Zadar players
NK Mosor players
HNK Cibalia players
Umeå FC players
NK Imotski players
RNK Split players
Croatian Football League players
Ettan Fotboll players
Croatian expatriate footballers
Expatriate footballers in Sweden
Croatian expatriate sportspeople in Sweden
Croatian football managers
NK GOŠK Dubrovnik managers